Pterocephalus lasiospermus (rosalillo de cumbre) is a species of shrub in the family Caprifoliaceae.

Etymology 
lasiospermus: lasios from the Greek, meaning "hairy" and sperma, meaning "seed", referring to it pappus.
The Spanish common name means "summit rosebush" in English.

Geographic distribution 
Endemic to Cañadas del Teide depression on Tenerife and the scrub  of the upper zones of the surrounding pine forest. Before the creation of the Teide National Park it was very scarce due to the damage from livestock pasturing.

Description 
Form is a shrub up to one meter in height. Its stems are grey, with simple leaves of pale green-grey, both are hairy. The inflorescence is a cushion-like head of pale pink flowers at the end of long stems. It blooms in early summer, which is late with respect to other species in its environment. As summer progresses, the flower head becomes a ball of whitish chaffy seeds.

References

External links 

Caprifoliaceae
Flora of the Canary Islands